The 2014 Winter Olympics cauldron was erected for the 2014 Winter Olympics in Sochi, Russia.

See also
 2008 Summer Olympics cauldron
 2010 Winter Olympics cauldron
 2012 Summer Olympics and Paralympics cauldron
 2016 Summer Olympics cauldron

External links
 

2014 establishments in Russia
Cauldron
Olympic flame